Generalized erythema is a skin condition that may be caused by medications, bacterial toxins, or viral infections.

See also 
 Necrolytic acral erythema
 List of cutaneous conditions

References

Erythemas